Jimmy Brohan (born 18 June 1935 in Ballintemple, Cork, Ireland) is an Irish retired sportsperson.  He played hurling with his local club Blackrock and was a member of the Cork senior inter-county team from 1954 until 1963.

Biography
Jimmy Brohan was born in Ballintemple, County Cork in 1935.  James Brohan Snr, his father, was a native of Fethard, County Tipperary who moved to Cork to work in the Metropole Hotel.  His mother, Mary Murphy, hailed from Ballintemple and also worked in the Metropole.  Brohan was the middle child in a family of seven and was educated at Sullivan's Quay CBS.  It was here that his hurling skills were first exploited.  Brohan played on the school hurling team in the Dr. Harty Cup for five consecutive years, the first two as goalkeeper and the last three as a corner-back.  In 1951 Brohan was at full-forward when Sullivan's Quay defeated the famous North Monastery in the Harty Cup, before later being defeated themselves by Thurles CBS.  In 1952 and 1953 he was chosen on the Munster Colleges hurling team which played in the inter-provincial competition.  He enjoyed much success and won two All-Ireland colleges' medals in both those years.

After leaving Sullivan's Quay in 1953 Brohan worked at the Dunlop's tyre centre in Cork until its closure in 1983.  Other Cork greats who also worked there included Johnny Clifford and Willie Murphy.  Brohan later worked with the Customs Service until his retirement in 2000.

Two of Brohan's brothers also had sporting success playing soccer in the League of Ireland.

Playing career

Club
Brohan played his club hurling with the famous Blackrock club in Cork and enjoyed much success.  In 1956 the club, with Brohan playing a key role, won the senior county championship for the first time in twenty-five years.  Another county title followed five years later in 1961.  Brohan also played Gaelic football with Blackrock's sister club called St Michael's and experienced some success. He won a county junior football championship title with the club in 1956.

Inter-county
Brohan first came to prominence on the inter-county scene in the early 1950s as a member of the Cork minor hurling team.  He was eligible to play for the team in both 1952 and 1953, however, Tipperary defeated Cork in the early rounds of the championship in both years.

At the end of 1953 Brohan made his senior debut for Cork in the National Hurling League.  He duly impressed the selectors and was subsequently called up to play in the All-Ireland semi-final against Galway.  Brohan was replacing the injured Tony O'Shaughnessy and had a good game, however, O'Shaughnessy returned for the All-Ireland final and Brohan was left on the bench as Cork claimed victory over Wexford.

In 1955 Brohan suffered a major setback when was suspended from all GAA activity for the year, due to his failure to turn up for a club game with St. Michael's. Clare defeated Cork in the opening round of the championship as Brohan watched on from the stand.

In 1956 Brohan was back with Cork and was installed at corner-back.  That year Cork reached the Munster final once again.  Limerick provided the opposition on that occasion; however, Cork recorded a 5–5 o 3–5 victory thanks to three goals by Christy Ring.  It was Brohan's first Munster winners' medal on the field of play. Cork later lined out in the All-Ireland final with Wexford providing the opposition.  The game has gone down in history as one of the all-time classic games as Christy Ring was bidding for a record ninth All-Ireland medal.  The game turned on one important incident as the Wexford goalkeeper, Art Foley, made a miraculous save from a Ring shot and cleared the sliotar up the field to set up another attack.  Wexford went on to win the game on a score line of 2–14 to 2–8 and Brohan was left with an All-Ireland runners-up medal.

Brohan added to his medal collection when he won a Munster junior football medal in 1957.  Once again Cork's hurlers reached the Munster final, however, they were defeated by Waterford on a score line of 1–11 to 1–6. In spite of a lack of success in 1958 Brohan was still included on a Sunday Review best hurling team of the year selection.

Brohan's side contested three consecutive provincial finals in 1959, 1960 and 1961, however, he ended up on the losing side on every occasion. In a Gael-Linn sponsored poll in the Irish Independent in 1961, Brohan was named in the right corner-back position on a hurling team considered to be the best ever.  He retired from inter-county hurling in the early 1960s.

Inter-provincial
Brohan also lined out with Munster in the inter-provincial hurling competition and enjoyed much success.  He first lined out with his province in 1957 and helped Munster to a 5–7 to 2–5 victory over Leinster.  This was the first of five consecutive Railway Cup victories for Brohan as part of the Munster team.  He won a sixth and final Railway Cup winners' medal in 1963 as Munster accounted for Leinster by just a single point.

Unique style of play
Brohan had a unique style of play, often described as tidy and economical. This was best illustrated by his defensive strategy which made him one of the most famous exponents of the batting skill in hurling and he often delighted the legions of Cork supporters in the 1950s and 1960s by batting away the ball to great distances out of defence to the frustration of opposing forwards. This was a tactic which was not very well developed or used to effect by his contemporaries and he duly deserved his reputation of being master of this particular skill which was best employed in a tight entanglement which did not allow room for the full natural hurley swing more conducive to loose marking and open play.

Retirement
Following his retirement as a player Brohan became involved as a selector with the county hurling team.  He was involved with the teams that won the All-Ireland titles in 1976, 1977, 1978 and 1986.  In the latter year Brohan had the pleasure of seeing his nephew, Tom Cashman, captain Cork to victory.

References

1935 births
Living people
Dual players
Blackrock National Hurling Club hurlers
Cork inter-county hurlers
Munster inter-provincial hurlers
St Michael's (Cork) Gaelic footballers
Cork inter-county Gaelic footballers
Hurling selectors